The Tbilisi Regional League (geo. თბილისის რეგიონალური ლიგა) was a football league organized in 2012, which serves as the fourth division in Georgia. Today it is contested in two groups, Group I and Group II.

Structure and league system
In TRL there are 20 amateur and youth clubs, mostly from Tbilisi and from east regions.

Teams 2012-2013 season

Group I

 Sakartvelos Universiteti 1
 FCN Dinamo Tbilsi U19
 FC Iberia Tbilisi
 T.S. Akademia U19
 U.G. Sakartvelos Universiteti
 FC Goliadori Tbilisi
 35-th FS 2
 FC Samgori Gardabani
 Torpedo-Avaza 1
 Sakartvelos Universiteti 3

Group II

 WIT Georgia
 T.S. Akademia U18
 FCN Dinamo Tbilsi U18
 FC Merani Tbilisi
 Sakartvelos Universiteti 3
 FC Gurjaani Gurjaani
 35-th FS 1
 FC Iberia 2 Tbilisi
 Olimpiki Tbilisi
 Torpedo-Avaza 2

External links 
 Tbilisi Football Federation page

4